William Norris Antliff (23 August 1848 – 29 April 1909) was an English cricketer who played first-class cricket for Derbyshire in 1880.

Antliff was born in Bottesford, Leicestershire and became a railway clerk. He played for Derbyshire Colts against the club in the 1879 season, although he was aged 30 at the time. He played two games for Derbyshire during the 1880 season. The first match was against the touring Australians in May and as it was completed in two days, the sides played an extra one innings match when Antliff made 37. His second first-class appearance was a few days later in a County match against Lancashire.

Antliff  was a right-handed batsman playing in or around the opening order. He played four innings in his two first-class matches making a total of 17 runs with a best score of five.

Antliff was living in 1881 with his wife and children at Litchurch in Derby. He died in Draycott.

References

1848 births
1909 deaths
English cricketers
Derbyshire cricketers
People from Bottesford, Leicestershire
Cricketers from Leicestershire
People from Derby